Newaygo County is a county in the U.S. state of Michigan. As of the 2020 United States Census, the population was 49,978. The county seat is White Cloud. The county was created in 1840, and was organized in 1851. It was either named for an Ojibwe leader who signed the Treaty of Saginaw in 1819 or for an Algonquian word meaning "much water".

Geography
The county is considered to be part of West Michigan.

The county has more than 230 natural lakes. The combined total length of all the county's rivers and streams exceeds 350 miles (560 km). Three huge dams, Croton, Hardy, and Newaygo, were built at the beginning of the 20th century. The Hardy Dam is the largest earthen dam east of the Mississippi. Over half of the county is in the Manistee National Forest.

Rivers
 Muskegon River
 Pere Marquette River
 Rogue River
 White River

Major highways
  runs east–west through center of county. Passes Hesperia, Aetna, and White Cloud.
  runs north–south through center of county. Passes Bitely, Brohman, White Cloud, Newaygo, Grant, and Ashland.
  runs east–west through southern part of county. Goes through Newaygo. Ends at county line tri-point of Muskegon, Oceana, and Newaygo Counties.
  runs the length of county's west line. Terminates in Hesperia.

County designated highways

Adjacent counties
 Mason County – northwest
 Lake County – north
 Osceola County - northeast
 Mecosta County – east
 Montcalm County – southeast
 Kent County – south
 Muskegon County – southwest
 Oceana County – west

National protected area
 Manistee National Forest (part)

Demographics

As of the 2000 United States Census, there were 47,874 people, 17,599 households, and 12,935 families in the county. There were 23,202 housing units at an average density of 28 per square mile (11/km2). The racial makeup of the county was 94.80% White, 1.12% Black or African American, 0.65% Native American, 0.29% Asian, 0.03% Pacific Islander, 1.63% from other races, and 1.48% from two or more races. 3.85% of the population were Hispanic or Latino of any race. 21.5% were of English ancestry, 20.5% were of German ancestry, 14.4% were of Dutch ancestry,  8.1% were of Irish ancestry and 5.0% were of Polish ancestry according to the 2010 American Community Survey. 95.7% spoke English and 3.2% Spanish as their first language.

There were 17,599 households, out of which 35.20% had children under the age of 18 living with them, 60.20% were married couples living together, 9.00% had a female householder with no husband present, and 26.50% were non-families. 22.20% of all households were made up of individuals, and 9.00% had someone living alone who was 65 years of age or older.  The average household size was 2.68 and the average family size was 3.13.

The county population contained 29.10% under the age of 18, 7.40% from 18 to 24, 27.50% from 25 to 44, 23.20% from 45 to 64, and 12.80% who were 65 years of age or older. The median age was 36 years. For every 100 females, there were 99.60 males. For every 100 females age 18 and over, there were 97.20 males.

The median income for a household in the county was $37,130, and the median income for a family was $42,498. Males had a median income of $35,549 versus $22,738 for females. The per capita income for the county was $16,976. About 9.00% of families and 11.60% of the population were below the poverty line, including 14.60% of those under age 18 and 8.50% of those age 65 or over.

Religion
 The Catholic church – 3,242 members
 The Christian Reformed Church in North America – 7 congregations and 2,056 members
 The United Methodist Church – 7 congregations and 1,600 members
 The Reformed Church in America – 3 congregations and 1,000 members
 The Church of Jesus Christ of Latter-day Saints - 1 meetinghouse in the county.
 The Seventh-day Adventist Church has only one church in Newaygo County.

Newaygo County is part of the Roman Catholic Diocese of Grand Rapids.

Economy
Tourism is the most important economic activity in Newaygo County. Secondly is a blend of agricultural and small manufacturing. International baby food manufacturer Gerber Products Company is currently the county's largest employer with approximately 1,300 employees.

Newaygo County also has a large number of summer cottage residents. Fishermen can find many steelhead in the spring and salmon in the fall within the county's rivers and streams. Camping, hunting, cross country skiing, bicycling, birding and ORVing is common in the Manistee National Forest.

Notable companies
 County of Newaygo - White Cloud
 Dura Automotive Systems - Fremont
 Gerber Memorial Health Services - Fremont
 Gerber Products Company - Fremont
 Magna Donnelly - Newaygo
 North American Refractories - White Cloud
 Valspar Corporation - Fremont
 Wilbur Ellis - Grant
 Newaygo Brewing - Newaygo

Government
Newaygo County has been strongly Republican since the Civil War era. Since 1884, the Republican Party nominee has carried the county vote in 91% of the national presidential elections (31 of 34). It has only supported a Democrat for president once in that time, in 1964. The Democrats have managed even 40 percent of the county's vote only four other times.

Newaygo County operates the County jail, maintains rural roads, operates the major local courts, records deeds, mortgages, and vital records, administers public health regulations, and participates with the state in the provision of social services. The county board of commissioners controls the budget and has limited authority to make laws or ordinances. In Michigan, most local government functions – police and fire, building and zoning, tax assessment, street maintenance etc. – are the responsibility of individual cities and townships.

Elected officials

 Prosecuting Attorney: Worth Stay
 Sheriff: Robert "Bob" Mendham
 County Clerk: Jason VanderStelt
 County Treasurer: Holly Moon
 Register of Deeds:Stewart K. Sanders
 Drain Commissioner: Dale Twing

(information as of September 2018)

Festivals and events

 Memorial Weekend Arts & Crafts Festival - Newaygo
 River Country Home & Garden Show - Newaygo Middle School
 Newaygo County Kids' Day - Downtown Newaygo
 Trail Town Celebration - Celebrating White Clouds Trails & Waterways
 City-Wide Yard Sales - Grant
 Harvest Celebration - Grant
 Harvest Festival - Fremont
 Logging Festival - Mid-Michigan Lumberjack Competition in Newaygo
 Bitely Homecoming - Bitely
 National Baby Food Festival - Fremont
 Pow Wow - White Cloud
 Santa Parade - Fremont
 West Michigan's Longest Yard Sale - Grant, Newaygo, White Cloud, Bitely
 Winterfest - Newaygo
 Christmas in Newaygo
 Christmas in Grant
 Christmas in White Cloud

Historic sites
In Newaygo County there are 16 locations that the State Historic Preservation Office has designated as historical. Two of the sixteen have been listed with the National Register of Historic Places:

 Big Prairie Grange Hall No. 935 - Goodwell Twp
 Birch Grove School - Lincoln Twp
 Croton Congregational Church - Croton Twp
 Croton Hydroelectric Plant - Croton Twp
 Ensley Windmill Tower
 First Christian Reformed Church (Demolished) - Fremont
 Gerber, Cornelius, Cottage - Sheridan Charter Twp
 Grant Depot and Water Tower - Grant
 Hardy Hydroelectric Plant - Big Prairie - Twp
 Lilley District No. 5 School - Lilley Twp
 Oak Grove District No. 3 Schoolhouse - Croton Twp
 Penoyer's Sawmill - Newaygo
 Saint Mark's Episcopal Church - Newaygo
 Weaver, Daniel, House - Denver Twp
 White Cloud Village Hall (Demolished) - White Cloud
 Woods, John F., Residence - Newaygo

Communities

Cities
 Fremont
 Grant
 Newaygo
 White Cloud (county seat)

Village
 Hesperia (partially)

Unincorporated communities
 Bitely
 Brunswick (partially)
 Riverview
 Woodland Park
 Croton

Townships
 Ashland Township
 Barton Township
 Beaver Township
 Big Prairie Township
 Bridgeton Township
 Brooks Township
 Croton Township
 Dayton Township
 Denver Township
 Ensley Township
 Everett Township
 Garfield Township
 Goodwell Township
 Grant Township
 Home Township
 Lilley Township
 Lincoln Township
 Merrill Township
 Monroe Township
 Norwich Township
 Sheridan Charter Township
 Sherman Township
 Troy Township
 Wilcox Township

See also
 Michigan State Historic Sites in Newaygo County
 National Register of Historic Places listings in Newaygo County

References

External links

 County of Newaygo 
 Newaygo County Convention and Visitors Bureau
 Newaygo County Road Commission
 Newaygo County Regional Educational Service Agency 
 Recycling for Newaygo County   

 
Michigan counties
Grand Rapids metropolitan area
1851 establishments in Michigan
Populated places established in 1851